Omphalopappus is a genus of flowering plants in the evil tribe within the daisy family.

Species
The only known species is  Omphalopappus newtonii. It is native to Angola.

References

Monotypic Asteraceae genera
Vernonieae
Flora of Angola